Kujo is an American outdoor footwear company specializing in shoes made for yard work. The company is based out of Cleveland, Ohio.

History
Kujo successfully launched on Kickstarter in June 2017, and began selling in February 2018.

The name "Kujo" is in honor of the founder's late cousin.

References 

Shoe companies of the United States
Companies based in Ohio
American companies established in 2016
2016 establishments in Ohio
Kickstarter-funded products